This article contains the results of the 2020 Libertarian Party presidential primaries and caucuses, non-binding electoral contests by various state affiliates of the Libertarian Party held to gauge support for Libertarian presidential candidates prior to the 2020 Libertarian National Convention.

Results summary table

Results by state

New Hampshire primary 
Mail-in ballots were due by January 11, at the state convention. The primary was tabulated using Bucklin voting. Percentages shown are percentage of ballots cast.

Iowa caucuses 
The Libertarian Party of Iowa conducted their caucuses on February 8, offering in-person caucus locations and an online virtual caucus. Only registered Libertarians were eligible to participate.

Minnesota caucuses 

The Libertarian Party of Minnesota used ranked-choice voting to tabulate the results of their caucus. After 7 rounds, Jacob Hornberger was declared the winner.

California primary

Massachusetts primary

North Carolina primary

Missouri primary

Ohio caucus 

Online voting took place from March 16 to April 11, with 192 participants. The primary was tabulated using instant runoff voting. Percentages shown are percentage of ballots cast.

Connecticut primary 
Voting took place from April 25–28, 2020.

New York primary

Nebraska primary

New Mexico primary

See also
 2020 Libertarian National Convention
 2020 Libertarian Party presidential primaries
 2020 United States presidential election

Notes

References

2020 Libertarian Party presidential primaries